Kępa Wysocka  is a part of Wysoczyn village, Gmina Sobienie-Jeziory. The population is near 50. From 1975 to 1998 this place was in Siedlce Voivodeship.

Villages in Otwock County